Galina Alekseyevna Kukleva or Koukleva (born 21 November 1972) is a retired Russian biathlete. At the 1998 Winter Olympics she won a gold medal in the 7.5 km sprint, and was a part of the team that won a silver medal in the relay. Four years later at the 2002 Winter Olympics she was a part of the team that won a bronze medal. In the World Championships she earned a silver medal in the mass start from 2000, in addition to five relay medals (gold in 2000, 2001 and 2003, silver in 1999 and bronze in 1997). She won 9 world cup competitions by the end of her career.

References 

 
 

1972 births
Living people
People from Ishimbay
Russian female biathletes
Olympic biathletes of Russia
Olympic gold medalists for Russia
Olympic silver medalists for Russia
Olympic bronze medalists for Russia
Biathletes at the 1998 Winter Olympics
Biathletes at the 2002 Winter Olympics
Olympic medalists in biathlon
Biathlon World Championships medalists
Medalists at the 2002 Winter Olympics
Medalists at the 1998 Winter Olympics
Tyumen State University alumni
Sportspeople from Bashkortostan
21st-century Russian women